Kizhakkummuri  is a village in Thrissur district in the state of Kerala, India.

See also
G.U.P.S, Padinhattummuri

References

Villages in Thrissur district